Muhammad Hadin bin Azman (born 2 July 1994) is a Malaysian professional footballer who plays as an attacking midfielder for Malaysia Super League club Penang and the Malaysia national team.

He began his youth career at CIMB-YFA Bintang Muda before signing for Harimau Muda B in 2012. He represented Malaysia U-19 since 2012. Known for his pace and trickery, Hadin is widely said as one of the brightest football prodigies of his age in Malaysia.

Club career

Harimau Muda B
Hadin Azman joined Harimau Muda B in 2012 at the age of 18. Together with the team, he played in the Malaysia Premier League and scored several goals and assists in the process. Due to his creditable performance during the 2012 season of Malaysia Premier League, he has attracted minor interests from PSV Eindhoven and Vitesse Arnhem of Eredivisie before eventually was loaned out to Johor Darul Ta'zim for 2012 Malaysia Cup campaign. He scored 2 goals in 4 games during the tournament.

Johor Darul Ta'zim

Despite being offered contracts from several clubs, he opted to play for Johor Darul Ta'zim, signing a lucrative 3-year contract deal with the club, under the guidance of team manager, Fandi Ahmad and head coach, Ismail Ibrahim. There are other notable players who signed for the southern side, such as ex-internationals Daniel Güiza, Simone Del Nero, and Malaysia national football team regular starters namely Safiq Rahim, Aidil Zafuan, Norshahrul Idlan and few others. Dubbed as the "Dream Team of Malaysian football", Hadin remains as one of the youngest players in the elite squad.

Felda United
After his contract with Johor Darul Ta'zim was terminated, Hadin joined Felda United in 2015. He played for the youth and first-team.

Kedah Darul Aman
On 4 November 2019, Hadin signed a contract with Kedah Darul Aman.

Kuala Lumpur City
On 25 December 2020, Hadin signed a two-year contract with Kuala Lumpur City.

International career
Hadin represented Malaysia at under-18 and senior team,l. He played in several international competitions such as Asian Schools Tournament Under-18, Hassanal Bolkiah Tournament Under-21, and RHB Singapore Cup. His first international caps is played against Singapore on 7 October 2016.

Career statistics

Club

International

Hadin represented Malaysia at senior team, and currently representing Malaysia. He first international caps is played against Singapore on 7 October 2016

As of match played 14 November 2016. Malaysia score listed first, score column indicates score after each Hadin Azman goal.

Honours

Club
Kuala Lumpur City
 Malaysia Cup: 2021
 AFC Cup runner-up: 2022 

Felda United
 Malaysia Super League runner-up: 2016
 Malaysian Premier League: 2018

Kedah Darul Aman
 Malaysia Super League runner-up: 2020

Individual
 CIMB Foundation Sports Scholarship (2011)
 Manchester United Premier Cup Regional Best Player (2009)
 Manchester United Premier Cup Grand Prix Malaysia Best Player (2009)

References

External links
 
 
 The Official Blog
 Talent Management Affiliate

1994 births
Sportspeople from Kuala Lumpur
Living people
Malaysian footballers
Association football midfielders
Malaysia Super League players
Malaysia Premier League players
Felda United F.C. players
Kedah Darul Aman F.C. players
Kuala Lumpur City F.C. players
Penang F.C. players
Malaysia international footballers
Johor Darul Ta'zim F.C. players